The 1992 Nigerian Senate election in Oyo State was held on July 4, 1992, to elect members of the Nigerian Senate to represent Oyo State. Ayantayo Ayandele representing Oyo North, Rasheed Ladoja representing Oyo South and Wande Abimbola representing Oyo Central all won on the platform of the Social Democratic Party.

Overview

Summary

Results

Oyo North 
The election was won by Ayantayo Ayandele of the Social Democratic Party.

Oyo South 
The election was won by Rasheed Ladoja of the Social Democratic Party.

Oyo Central 
The election was won by Wande Abimbola of the Social Democratic Party.

References 

Oyo
Oyo State Senate elections
July 1992 events in Nigeria